Delugan Meissl Associated Architects (DMAA) is an Austrian architecture firm based in Vienna, Austria. DMAA has designed notable buildings including the Porsche Museum, Stuttgart and the EYE Film Institute Netherlands.

History
Delugan Meissl Associated Architects – DMAA for short – is a Vienna-based architectural office, which was founded by Elke Delugan-Meissl and Roman Delugan as Delugan Meissl ZT GmbH in 1993. Dietmar Feistel and Martin Josst have been partners since 2004. The management team is completed by the associated partners Sebastian Brunke and Bernd Heger and the project partner Philip Beckmann.

The office works on a broad range of building projects in Europe, North America and Asia, many of which have been preceded by success in an architectural competition.

The origins of the office can be traced back to a series of large residential buildings in Vienna, with which Delugan Meissl made a name for themselves at an early stage through their use of a powerful and autonomous formal language.

“The ultimate aim of the design process is to experience that magical moment, to discover that point in the imagination or that basic idea from which everything else springs.” (Roman Delugan)

The design process, which is based on an intuitive approach but developed with systematic precision, pays special attention to the functional integration  and the spatial incorporation of the building into the surrounding urban or landscape context.

Against the background of a continuous examination of the subject of housing, the Austrian Contribution to the 15th Architecture Biennale in Venice in 2016, which was curated by Elke Delugan-Meissl under the title “Places for People”, was devoted to the movement of refugees towards Europe, which was then at its height, and the associated challenge of how to offer people dignified accommodation at very short notice.

The architects, who were honored with the Grand Austrian State Prize in 2015, are, "among Austria's most internationally successful architects" who are distinguished by their "multi-layered, partly radical work in the field of architecture" according to the Minister of Culture Dr. Josef Ostermayer.

Selected works

 Offshore Borkum, Germany, 2020
 Taiyuan Botanical Garden, China, 2020
 Taiyuan Zoo Panda House, China, 2020
 Campus Tower, Hamburg, Germany, 2019
 Deschamps-Braly Clinic of Plastic & Craniofacial Surgery, San Francisco, USA, 2019
 Hyundai Motorstudio, Goyang, South Korea, 2017
 MIBA Forum Building, Austria, 2017
 University Campus Krems, Austria, 2016
 Geriatric Centre Donaustadt, Austria, 2014
 Tourist Info, Vienna, Austria, 2014
 Casa Invisibile, Slovenia, 2013
 Festival Hall Erl, Austria, 2012
 EYE Film Institute Netherlands, The Netherlands, 2011
 FH Campus Wien, Austria, 2009
Porsche Museum, Germany, 2008 
Delugan-Meissl-Tower, Austria, 2005 
 City Lofts Wienerberg, Vienna, 2004
 House Ray 1, Austria, 2003 
 Beam Donaucity, Austria, 1998

Questions and architecture 
In order to do justice to the special responsibility of architecture, DMAA has established its own online magazine entitled “Questions and Architecture”, which offers a profound investigative-journalistic and cultural-scientific insight into general developments and current challenges, illustrated with references to some of the office's current projects.

Prizes (selection) 

 Red Dot Design Award (TEELA Zumtobel Office), 2019
 iF Design Award (TEELA Zumtobel Office), 2019
 iF Design Award (Tourist Info Vienna), 2016
 Grand Austrian State Prize for Elke Delugan-Meissl and Roman Delugan, 2015
 Nomination for the Mies van der Rohe Award (Festival Hall Erl), 2015
 Silver Medal of the City of Vienna for Elke Delugan-Meissl and Roman Delugan, 2015
 iF Design Award (Tendo), 2015
 Nomination for the Mies van der Rohe Award (EYE Film Institute Amsterdam), 2013
 Red Dot Design Award (IYON Led spotlight series), 2012
 Nomination for the Mies van der Rohe Award (Porsche Museum), 2009
 WALLPAPER* Award in association with Jaguar (Porsche Museum), 2008
 Architecture Prize of the City of Vienna (High-Rise Wienerberg), 2006
 German Prize for Reconstruction (Haus Ray1), 2004
 Client Prize (Townhouse Wimbergergasse), 2002

Exhibitions 

 Places for People, Austrian Pavilion, Biennale Architettura di Venezia, Venice, Italy, 2016 (Elke Delugan-Meissl as Curator)
 Housing in Vienna, Touring Exhibition: New York, San Francisco, Los Angeles and Washington D.C., 2013–2014 (Group Exhibition)
 inTENSE repose, Touring Exhibition: Vienna, Cologne, Berlin, Zurich, New York, et al. 2006–2007 (Solo Exhibition)
 State of Flux, Touring Exhibition: Merano 2002, Glasgow, London, Manchester, Amsterdam, Berlin, et al. 2006 (Solo Exhibition)
 Deep Surface, 1st International Architectural Biennale, Beijing, China, 2004 (Group Exhibition)

Books
ZOOM & 360°, ed. Delugan Meissl Associated Architects and Liquid Frontiers, Vienna, 2018
Design Peak 08 Delugan Meissl Associated Architects, Seoul, 2011, 
VOL. 1. Delugan Meissl Associated Architects, ed. Delugan Meissl Associated Architects, Vienna, 2010, 
Porsche Museum. Delugan Meissl Associated Architects. HG Merz, ed. Springer Verlag, Vienna, 2009, 
Delugan Meissl Associated Architects. Realized projects. Current projects. Competitions, ed. Caroline Klein, Cologne, 2006, 
inTENSE repose. Delugan Meissl Associated Architects, ed. Kristin Feireiss, Berlin, 2006, 
Delugan Meissl 2. Concepts. Projects. Buildings. (2 volumes.), ed. Robert Temel, Liesbeth Waechter-Böhm, Basel, 2001, ISBN 103-7643-6557-9

References

External links
 Delugan Meissl Associated Architects
 "Questions And Architecture", Online-Magazine hosted by DMAA

Architecture firms of Austria
Companies based in Vienna